Heidi's Song is a 1982 American animated musical film produced by Hanna-Barbera Productions and based on the 1881 novel Heidi by Johanna Spyri. The film was directed by Robert Taylor from a screenplay by Taylor, Joseph Barbera and Jameson Brewer, and stars Margery Gray as the title character, alongside the voices of Lorne Greene and Sammy Davis Jr. It is one of only four films Hanna-Barbera ever made that did not feature their trademark characters (along with Charlotte's Web, C.H.O.M.P.S., and Once Upon a Forest).

The film was released on November 19, 1982 by Paramount Pictures. Its box office receipts were disappointing, attributed by Joseph Barbera to incompetent distribution; the film was released the same week as two other animated features.

Plot 
An orphaned girl named Heidi is sent to live with her paternal grandfather by her maternal Aunt Dete, who has been looking after Heidi since she was a baby. Heidi's grandfather initially dislikes having Heidi around because she interferes in his routine. But when her grandfather hurts his leg, Heidi helps nurse him back to health, and during this time the two bond together. Heidi meets the local goatherd, a boy named Peter, and often goes with him and the village's goats on their daily grazing trips higher up the Swiss Alps.

One day, however, Heidi's Aunt Dete arrives to take Heidi away again, saying that a wealthy family in Frankfurt, Germany, wants Heidi to come live with them. Heidi's grandfather reluctantly lets her go. Heidi arrives at the house in Frankfurt, where she learns she's supposed to become the companion of a wealthy but invalid girl named Klara. Klara's Governess and guardian Fräulein Rottenmeier disapproves of Heidi's simple country ways, but Klara likes Heidi and insists that she stays. Heidi brings joy into Klara's life, especially when she gives Klara a basket of kittens as a present. When Rottenmeier discovers the kittens, Heidi is locked in the rat-infested basement.

Peter and the country animals come to Heidi's rescue. Together with Klara, the three travel to the Wunderhorn without telling Rottenmeier. At this time, Klara's father returns to Frankfurt after being away on business, and is angered that his daughter has disappeared. He immediately leaves for the Wunderhorn, and this time Rottenmeier and the butler Sebastian take the opportunity to flee.

The three children travel up the mountain, but Klara stops halfway so that Heidi can run on ahead without pushing her wheelchair. Heidi runs ahead and is joyfully reunited with her grandfather. Back halfway down the mountain, Klara's kitten Snowball is attacked by a hawk. Klara crawls out of her wheelchair and uses a stick to fight off the hawk. Klara then discovers that she is able to stand. Klara's father arrives and together they celebrate Klara's mobility and Heidi's return.

Voice cast 
 Lorne Greene as Grandfather
 Sammy Davis Jr. as Head Ratte
 Margery Gray as Heidi
 Michael Bell as Willie
 Peter Cullen as Gruffle
 Roger DeWitt as Peter
 Richard Erdman as Herr Sessmann
 Fritz Feld as Sebastian 
 Pamelyn Ferdin as Klara
 Joan Gerber as Fräulein Rottenmeier
 Virginia Gregg as Aunt Dete
 Janet Waldo as Tinette
 Frank Welker as Schnoddle and Hootie
 Michael Winslow as Mountain

Music
Hoyt Curtin scored the film, while Sammy Cahn and Burton Lane wrote the songs.

Original songs performed in the film include:

Critical reception 
Movie historian Leonard Maltin gave the picture just 1.5 out of a possible 4 stars, declaring it "...Little better than most Saturday morning fare -- due to awkward continuity, lifeless animation, and an excess of cute animals."

Home media
The film was first released on VHS in 1985 by Worldvision Home Video. GoodTimes Home Video (under their Kids Klassics label) re-released the film on VHS in 1988. Turner Home Entertainment gave the film one final VHS re-release in 1998. Warner Home Video released the film to DVD-R for the first time on July 31, 2012 through Warner Archive.

See also 
 List of animated feature films of 1982
 1982 in film
 Rock Odyssey - the 1987 film that was meant to be the follow-up to this film

References

External links 
 
 Heidi's Song at the Big Cartoon DataBase
 
 Excerpt
 Heidi's Song on Amazon

1982 films
1982 animated films
1980s musical films
American children's animated fantasy films
American children's animated musical films
Films set in Frankfurt
Heidi films
Films set in Switzerland
Hanna-Barbera animated films
1980s American animated films
Paramount Pictures animated films
Paramount Pictures films
Animated films based on children's books
Animated films about orphans
Films produced by William Hanna
Films produced by Joseph Barbera
Animated films based on novels
Films scored by Hoyt Curtin
1980s children's animated films
1980s English-language films